Nakama (written: 仲間 or 名嘉真) is a Japanese surname. Notable people with the surname include:

, Japanese karateka
Dave Nakama, American college baseball coach
, Japanese footballer
Keo Nakama (1920–2011), American swimmer
, Japanese actress, singer and idol

Japanese-language surnames
Okinawan surnames